La Puebla del Mon is a hamlet located in the municipality of Graus, in Huesca province, Aragon, Spain. As of 2020, it has a population of 2.

Geography 
La Puebla del Mon is located 88km east of Huesca.

References

Populated places in the Province of Huesca